In Norse mythology, Gleipnir (Old Norse "open one") is the binding that holds the mighty wolf Fenrir (as attested in chapter 34 of the Prose Edda book Gylfaginning). The Gods had attempted to bind Fenrir twice before with huge chains of metal, but Fenrir was able to break free both times. Therefore, they commissioned the dwarves to forge a chain that was impossible to break. The dwarves made the chain magically from six things in the world (and these things are now missing in the world because they were taken away to be part of the chain): 

 The sound of a cat's footfall
 The beard of women
 The roots of mountains
 The sinews of the bear
 The breath of the fish
 The spittle of the birds

Even though Gleipnir is as thin as a silken ribbon, it is stronger than any iron chain. It was forged by the dwarves in their underground realm of Niðavellir.

Gleipnir, having bound Fenrir securely, was the cause of Týr's lost hand, for Fenrir bit it off in revenge when he was not freed. Gleipnir is said to hold until Ragnarök, when Fenrir will finally break free and devour Odin.

Citations

General and cited references 
 Orchard, Andy (1997). Dictionary of Norse Myth and Legend. Cassell. 

Artifacts in Norse mythology
Mythological objects